, commonly known by its acronym FTS, was a railway company in the Basque Country, Spain. Founded in 1947 as the merger of various railway companies, it operated several suburban rail lines in the Greater Bilbao area. FEVE took over its operations in 1972, which in 1982 were transferred to the new company Basque Railways.

History 

FTS was founded in 1947 with the merger of two independent railways and two lines operated by another company:
 Lutxana-Mungia railway, an independent company.
 Bilbao-Lezama railway, an independent company.
 Bilbao-Las Arenas-Plentzia railway and the Matico-Azbarren branch, operated by the Bilbao-Santander Railway Company.
Aside from the railways, FTS also operated several tram and bus lines. The Bilbao-Plentzia line had been electrified since the 1920s, and shortly after the establishment of the new company the remaining non-electrified lines were electrified too.

The rolling stock was renovated starting in the 1950s, but by the 1960s the company was in financial difficulties. Rather than due to low ridership, they were caused by the artificially low fares imposed by the government, which didn't subsidize the company. In 1969, a landslide forced the closure of the Matico-Azbarren line and the relocation of the Bilbao-Lezama terminus out of central Bilbao. In 1975, due to the lengthening of the airport runway, most of the Lutxana-Mungia line had to close too. On 30 December 1977, FEVE took over the operations of the network.

Despite ceasing operations in 1977, the company wasn't immediately disbanded. In May 1983, after all the legal difficulties it faced were solved, the board of directors proposed the dissolution of the company, which happened in December that year.

Rolling stock 
After the merger, the new company inherited the rolling stock owned by its predecessors. The steam locomotives inherited from the Bilbao-Lezama and Lutxana-Mungia railways were retired soon after the merger, as since 1950 the whole FTS network was electrified.

Electric rolling stock

References

Citations

Sources

External links
 

1947 establishments in Spain
Railway companies established in 1947
1983 disestablishments in the Basque Country (autonomous community)
Railway companies disestablished in 1983
Railway companies of the Basque Country (autonomous community)
Organisations based in Bilbao